Warszawa  is a settlement in the administrative district of Gmina Stara Kiszewa, within Kościerzyna County, Pomeranian Voivodeship, in northern Poland.

For details of the history of the region, see History of Pomerania.

References

External Link
The Rehabilitation and Ethnic Vetting of the Polish Population in the Voivodship of Gdańsk after World War II

Villages in Kościerzyna County